John Arundell, 3rd Baron Arundell of Trerice (died Sep 1706) of Trerice, Cornwall, who inherited his peerage on the death of his father in 1698.

Origins
Arundell was the son and heir of John Arundell, 2nd Baron Arundell of Trerice, Cornwall by his wife Margaret Acland (died 1691), daughter of Sir John Acland, of Columb John, Devon, by his wife Margaret Rolle.

Marriages and children
Arundell married Jane Beau, daughter of William Beau of Llandaff, Glamorgan, Wales, who was Bishop of Llandaff.
John Arundell, 4th Baron Arundell (1701-1768), heir.

References

1649 births
1706 deaths
3
John, 23rd Baron Arundell of Trerice